The Cedar Creek Bridge is a historic bridge in rural southern Independence County, Arkansas. The bridge was built 1941, and was probably designed by an engineer of the state's highway department.

The bridge was listed on the National Register of Historic Places in 1995.

See also
List of bridges documented by the Historic American Engineering Record in Arkansas
List of bridges on the National Register of Historic Places in Arkansas
National Register of Historic Places listings in Independence County, Arkansas

References

External links

Road bridges on the National Register of Historic Places in Arkansas
Bridges completed in 1941
Historic American Engineering Record in Arkansas
National Register of Historic Places in Independence County, Arkansas
Stone arch bridges in the United States
Transportation in Independence County, Arkansas
1941 establishments in Arkansas